Peter II of Alençon, called The Noble (1340 – 20 September 1404; , or Pierre de Valois), was Count of Alençon from 1361 and Count of Perche from 1377. He was the son of Charles II of Alençon and Maria de la Cerda.

Biography
Knighted in 1350, Peter was one of the hostages exchanged for King John after the Battle of Poitiers, and did not return to France until 1370. He and his brother Robert campaigned against the English in Aquitaine, taking Limoges, but failed to capture Usson (1371).

On 10 October 1371, Peter married Marie Chamaillart, Viscountess of Beaumont-au-Maine. They had:

 Marie of Alençon (29 March 1373–1417), married 1390 in Paris John VII of Harcourt, Count of Harcourt and Aumale (died 1452).
 Peter (1374–1375)
 John (1375–1376)
 Marie (1377)
 Jeanne (1378–1403, Argentan)
 Catherine (1380, Verneuil – 25 June 1462, Paris), married 1411 in Alençon Peter d'Évreux, Infante of Navarre and Count of Mortain (1366–1412), married 1 October 1413 in Paris Louis VII, Duke of Bavaria-Ingolstadt (1365–1447)
 Marguerite (1383 – aft. 1400), became a nun at Argentan
 John I of Alençon (1385–1415)

He subsequently fought under Guesclin in Brittany and was wounded before Hennebont, and took part in an expedition against William I of Guelders in 1388.

He also had one illegitimate son:
 Peter,  "Bastard of Alençon" (d. aft. January 1422), Lord of Aunou

In popular culture
In the 2021 film The Last Duel directed by Ridley Scott, his role was played by actor Ben Affleck.

Ancestry

References

Sources

Peter II of Alençon
Peter II of Alençon
House of Valois-Alençon
Peter II
Counts of Perche
14th-century peers of France
15th-century peers of France